"Get Like Me" is the second single from David Banner's sixth album, The Greatest Story Ever Told. The song features Chris Brown and samples several lines from "It's Goin' Down" by fellow rapper Yung Joc, who, while not officially credited or featured, appears in the song's music video. There was an alternate version of the song featuring Jim Jones, but label troubles prevented his version from being released.

Reception
AllMusic editor David Jeffries highlighted the song as did Robert Christgau. Sputnikmusic's Maximilan Harknes wrote a positive review: "Another song that stands out on the album is the big hit single 'Get Like Me' in all of its spastic, mainstream goodness (...) David Banner's production gives the 'Ballin!' feel ('Get Like Me')."

Music video
The video was shot at Los Angeles and directed by Ulysses Terrero. Chris Brown guest-stars in the video, as does Yung Joc. Cameos include Barry Bonds, Gabrielle Union, and the Maloof family brothers Gavin and Joe. The music video was released May 13, 2008 on BET's 106 & Park, but was leaked a few days earlier. Banner is seen at two points in the video wearing a shirt saying "I miss Pimp C", a reference to the deceased southern rapper. He also goes on and says in the song, "I got Chad in my heart, and DJ Screw in my cup." Chad was Pimp C's first name.

Remixes
Lil Wayne released a freestyle of "Get Like Me", titled "Stuntin" with Canadian rapper Drake, on his mixtape Dedication 3. The official remix features Jim Jones.

Charts

The song first appeared on the US Bubbling Under R&B/Hip-Hop Songs chart at number 10; this was the version featuring Jim Jones, then after two weeks on the chart, it peaked at No. 93 on the main Hot R&B/Hip-Hop Songs chart, then falling off completely so the official single without Jim Jones could chart. This single has proven to be David Banner's second most successful to date, hitting number 16 on the Billboard Hot 100, after "Play", which hit number seven.

Weekly charts

Year-end charts

References

2007 songs
2008 singles
David Banner songs
Chris Brown songs
Song recordings produced by David Banner
Songs written by David Banner
Universal Motown Records singles